First Nation Airways Ltd. was a Nigerian airline with its headquarters in Lagos and base at Murtala Mohammed Airport.

History
First Nation Airways (SS) Limited is a privately owned, passenger airline. It commenced daily flights to Nnamdi Azikiwe International Airport in October 2013 and planned an additional aircraft expansion in 2019 to 2020. In May 2018 however, the Nigerian authorities suspended the airlines operations as her two aircraft were ferried out on maintenance check . As of June 2019, the airline did not resume any flights as they are still undergoing re-certification process .

Destinations
First Nation Airways served the following destinations:

Abuja - Nnamdi Azikiwe International Airport
Lagos - Murtala Mohammed International Airport base
Port Harcourt - Port Harcourt International Airport

Fleet

The First Nation Airways fleet consisted of the following aircraft:

In September 2020, One of First Nation's A319, with registration 5N-FNE was scrapped.

Former fleet
The airline previously operated the following aircraft:
3 Airbus A320-200 (2011-2012)

References

External links

 Official website

Defunct airlines of Nigeria
Airlines established in 2011
Airlines disestablished in 2018
Nigerian companies established in 2011
2018 disestablishments in Nigeria
Companies based in Lagos